Agdistis meyi is a moth in the family Pterophoridae. It is known from South Africa and Zimbabwe.

References

Agdistinae
Moths of Africa
Moths described in 2008